"Tongue Tied" is the second single from Faber Drive's debut album, Seven Second Surgery. The song is about a man struggling to keep his relationship together with his girlfriend, and how he cannot find the right words to please her. It did very well on the charts, peaking at number 17 on the Canadian Hot 100, and outperformed the previous single, "Second Chance", which reached number 26. It was number 1 on Musique Plus in Quebec and number 1 on the MuchMusic Countdown.

Music video
In the video, a girl is taking a bath while a boy knocks on her door with flowers. She opens the door, immediately rejects him, and walks into another room down the hall. The boy throws the flowers across the room angrily, and they land in the bathtub. The band is shown playing in the basement of the apartment complex, with water dripping on their instruments. The video cuts back to the girl getting out of the bath. She proceeds to get dressed and go to sit in her room, where she looks at a picture of her and her boyfriend. It cuts back to the band playing in the basement; rose petals are now falling on the instruments along with the water. When it cuts back to the girl, the boy has just opened the door and is standing in the doorway. They make up, and the boy takes out a ring. The two kiss, and the water dripping into the basement recedes back into the bathtub.

Chart performance

References

External links
 

Faber Drive songs
2007 singles
Songs written by Chad Kroeger
Songs written by Brian Howes
2006 songs
Universal Records singles